Carolinacetus is an extinct protocetid early whale found in the Bartonian Tupelo Bay Formation (paleocoordinates ) in Berkeley County, South Carolina.

Carolinacetus is known from an incomplete cranium with portions of the right inner ear, a detached rostrum, and parts of both mandibles with 11 teeth.  Preserved from the postcranium are 13 vertebrae and 15 ribs.  The holotype was collected in 1994.

Several anatomical features identifies Carolinacetus as a protocetid (and therefore as a member of Pelagiceti) including: external nares are located above the canine, the supraoccipital (in cetaceans, the part of the occipital bone located above the foramen magnum and directed backwards) is narrow and tubular, accessory cusps absent on M3, a broad connection between the ectotympanic bulla and the falciform process of the squamosal, axis vertebra with large vertebral foramen.

In Carolinacetus the naral openings are located in front of P1, making it the most basal North American cetacean.  Carolinacetus is distinct from other North American cetaceans, it is 8-15% larger than Georgiacetus and differs from it in several cranial characters.

Notes

References

 
 
 

Fossils of the United States
Protocetidae
Fossil taxa described in 2005
Prehistoric cetacean genera